Rude Dog and the Dweebs is a 1989 Saturday morning cartoon television series developed by Sun Sportswear based on Rude Dog. Rude Dog and the Dweebs was as colorful as the clothing it advertised. The punkish pooch himself drove a 1959 pink Cadillac across a backdrop of Beverly Hills imagined in hues of pastel and neon. The series was produced by Marvel Productions.

Rude Dog (voiced by Rob Paulsen in a Brooklyn accent) runs an auto shop, where he is assisted by the Dweebs, a motley mix of mutt minions. The team includes the stuttering Dachshund Caboose (voiced by Frank Welker), the uptight Bulldog Winston (voiced by Peter Cullen in an English accent), the Smooth Fox Terrier Reginald a.k.a. Reggie (voiced by Mendi Segal impersonating Jack Nicholson), the Great Dane Barney (voiced by Dave Coulier in a Southern accent), the Chinese Crested mix Ditzy Kibble (voiced by Ellen Gerstell), the Beagle Satch (voiced by Jim Cummings impersonating Ed Wynn), and the friendly Chihuahua Tweek (voiced by Hank Saroyan). Rude Dog has a girlfriend named Gloria (voiced by Ellen Gerstell).

Their feline foe is the vicious Seymour (also voiced by Frank Welker), and joining him in the chase is the ubiquitous dog catcher Herman (also voiced by Peter Cullen) and his dimwitted Rottweiler assistant Rot (also voiced by Frank Welker). Each week, Rude Dog and company balance their auto shop duties with attempts to elude the persistent Seymour, Herman, and Rot.

The show aired in the United States on CBS from September 16, 1989 to December 16, 1989 for one season. It was also broadcast around the world on various channels such as the BBC, The Children's Channel, Sky1, Gold and Nickelodeon in the U.K., Network Ten and Fox Kids in Australia, M-Net, SABC 1 and SABC 2 in South Africa, Club Super3 in Spain, ZNBC in Zambia, TV1 and TV3 in Malaysia, Dubai 33 in the U.A.E., Mediacorp Channel 5 and Prime 12 in Singapore, TVB Pearl in Hong Kong, GMA Network in the Philippines, Magic Kids in Argentina, TV3 in Sweden, Star Plus in India, TVRI in Indonesia, TV2 in New Zealand and ZBC TV in Zimbabwe. It also spawned home entertainment releases in the United States by Celebrity Home Entertainment through their Just for Kids home video label. In the United Kingdom it was released on the VHS Leisureview Video and Boulevard Entertainment labels.

Ownership of the series passed to Disney in 2001 when Disney acquired Fox Kids Worldwide, which also includes Marvel Productions. The series is not available on Disney+.

Episodes

Home media
Beginning in 1989, select episodes were released in the United States on 30-minute, 60-minute, and 120-minute NTSC VHS tapes and laserdiscs by Celebrity Home Entertainment's "Just for Kids Mini-Features" line.
Beginning in 1990, select episodes were released in the United Kingdom on 70-minute, PAL VHS tapes by Leisureview Video (MARVEL VIDEO COMICS),  rated  U  for "Universal" and deemed suitable for all ages.
The series was distributed by New World Television, which was owned by Sun Sportswear, the makers of the "Rude Dog" toys. As a result, Sun Sportswear must give approval before any future home video releases of the series are made available.

In the U.K., the series was released on VHS by Leisureview Video in 1990.

Rude Dog and the Dweebs was also released on DVD around 2005.

Reception
In 2014, listing it among 12 1980s cartoons that did not deserve remembrance, io9 characterized the series as "an animated atrocity", noting that the series appeared to glorify the "rudeness" that was the main character's defining characteristic.

References

External links
 
 Official Rude Dog website

1989 American television series debuts
1989 American television series endings
1980s American animated television series
American children's animated comedy television series
Animated television series about dogs
CBS original programming
English-language television shows
Television series by Marvel Productions
Television series by Saban Entertainment
Television series by Disney–ABC Domestic Television